An electrical conductivity meter (EC meter) measures the electrical conductivity in a solution. It has multiple applications in research and engineering, with common usage in hydroponics, aquaculture, aquaponics, and freshwater systems to monitor the amount of nutrients, salts or impurities in the water.

Principle  
Common laboratory conductivity meters employ a potentiometric method and four electrodes. Often, the electrodes are cylindrical and arranged concentrically. The electrodes are usually made of platinum metal. An alternating current is applied to the outer pair of the electrodes. The potential between the inner pair is measured. Conductivity could in principle be determined using the distance between the electrodes and their surface area using Ohm's law but generally, for accuracy, a calibration is employed using electrolytes of well-known conductivity.

Industrial conductivity probes often employ an inductive method, which has the advantage that the fluid does not wet the electrical parts of the sensor. Here, two inductively-coupled coils are used. One is the driving coil producing a magnetic field and it is supplied with accurately-known voltage. The other forms a secondary coil of a transformer. The liquid passing through a channel in the sensor forms one turn in the secondary winding of the transformer. The induced current is the output of the sensor.

Another way is to use four-electrode conductivity sensors that are made from corrosion-resistant materials. A benefit of four-electrode conductivity sensors compared to inductive sensors is scaling compensation and the ability to measure low (below 100 μS/cm) conductivities (a feature especially important when measuring near-100% hydrofluoric acid).

Temperature dependence 

The conductivity of a solution is highly temperature dependent, so it is important either to use a temperature compensated instrument, or to calibrate the instrument at the same temperature as the solution being measured. Unlike metals, the conductivity of common electrolytes typically increases with increasing temperature.

Over a limited temperature range, the way temperature affects the conductivity of a solution can be modeled linearly using the following formula:

where 
T is the temperature of the sample,
Tcal is the calibration temperature,
σT is the electrical conductivity at the temperature T,
σTcal is the electrical conductivity at the calibration temperature Tcal,
α is the temperature compensation gradient of the solution.

The temperature compensation gradient for most naturally occurring samples of water is about 2%/C°; however it can range between 1 and 3%/C°. The compensation gradients for some common water solutions are listed in the table below.

Conductivity measurement applications  

Conductivity measurement is a versatile tool in process control. The measurement is simple and fast, and most advanced sensors require only a little maintenance. The measured conductivity reading can be used to make various assumptions on what is happening in the process. In some cases it is possible to develop a model to calculate the concentration of the liquid.
 
Concentration of pure liquids can be calculated when the conductivity and temperature is measured. The preset curves for various acids and bases are commercially available. For example, one can measure the concentration of high purity hydrofluoric acid using conductivity-based concentration measurement [Zhejiang Quhua Fluorchemical, China Valmet Concentration 3300]. A benefit of conductivity- and temperature-based concentration measurement is the superior speed of inline measurement compared to an on-line analyzer.
 
Conductivity-based concentration measurement has limitations. The concentration-conductivity dependence of most acids and bases is not linear. Conductivity-based measurement cannot determine on which side of the peak the measurement is, and therefore the measurement is only possible on a linear section of the curve. 
Kraft pulp mills use conductivity-based concentration measurement to control alkali additions to various stages of the cook. Conductivity measurement will not determine the specific amount of alkali components, but it is a good indication on the amount of effective alkali (NaOH +  Na2S as NaOH or Na2O) or active alkali (NaOH + Na2S as NaOH or Na2O) in the cooking liquor. The composition of the liquor varies between different stages of the cook. Therefore, it is necessary to develop a specific curve for each measurement point or to use commercially available products.
  
The high pressure and temperature of cooking process, combined with high concentration of alkali components, put a heavy strain on conductivity sensors that are installed in process. The scaling on the electrodes needs to be taken into account, otherwise the conductivity measurement drifts, requiring increased calibration and maintenance.

See also
Conductivity factor
Salinometer
Total dissolved solids
TDS meter

References

External links

[./Https://www.astm.org/d1125-14.html ASTM D1125-14 Standard Test Methods for Electrical Conductivity and Resistivity of Water]
ASTM D5682
DIN 55667

Electrochemistry
Measuring instruments